Larry Borom (born March 30, 1999) is an American football offensive tackle for the Chicago Bears of the National Football League (NFL). He played college football at Missouri and was drafted by the Bears in the fifth round of the 2021 NFL Draft.

Early career
Borom played at Birmingham Brother Rice where he was nominated 1st team all-Detroit North in 2016.

College career

Borom was ranked as a threestar recruit by 247Sports.com coming out of high school. He committed to Missouri on August 23, 2016. Borom red-shirted his freshman season in 2017. His presence was noticed early as offensive line coach Glen Elarbee called Borom a "Coke machine with a helmet on." As a redshirt freshman, Borom played in all 13 games for the 2018 season seeing time on special teams and as a backup right tackle. In 2019, Borom started 11 games beginning the season as the starting right guard before settling into the right tackle position for the latter half. For the 2020 campaign, Borom started all games as a right tackle. He was named 2nd team All-SEC by Pro Football Focus and 3rd team All-SEC by Phil Steele. Shortly after the season, Borom announced his intention to forgo his senior season and declare for the NFL Draft.

Professional career

Borom was drafted by the Chicago Bears with the 151st pick of the 2021 NFL Draft on May 1, 2021. On June 2, Borom signed his four-year rookie contract with Chicago. He was placed on injured reserve on September 18, 2021 after suffering an ankle injury in Week 1. He was activated on October 30, 2021.

References

1999 births
Living people
People from Bloomfield, Oakland County, Michigan
Sportspeople from Oakland County, Michigan
Players of American football from Michigan
American football offensive linemen
Missouri Tigers football players
Chicago Bears players